Polje is a village in the municipality of Višegrad, Bosnia and Herzegovina.

References

Populated places in Višegrad